Rio Vista Independent School District is a public school district based in Rio Vista, Texas (USA).

Located in southern Johnson County, a small portion of the district extends into northern Hill County.

In 2009, the school district was rated "academically acceptable" by the Texas Education Agency.

Schools
Rio Vista High (Grades 9-12)
Rio Vista Middle (Grades 6-8)
Rio Vista Elementary (Grades PK-5)

References

External links
Rio Vista ISD

School districts in Johnson County, Texas
School districts in Hill County, Texas